Violante Manuel of Castile (c. 1265 – Lisbon, 1314) was a Castilian noble, daughter of Manuel of Castile and his first wife Constance of Aragon. She was Lady of Elche, Elda, Novelda, Medellín and half of Peñafiel in her own right.

Tomb of Violante Manuel
At her death, the body of Violante Manuel was buried in the Convent of Santo Domingo, but was destroyed because of 1755 Lisbon earthquake.

Issue
With her husband Afonso of Portugal, Lord of Portalegre, she had five children:
 Afonso of Portugal, Lord of Leiria
 Maria of Portugal, Lady of Meneses and Orduña
 Isabel of Portugal, Lady of Penela, married Juan de Castilla y Haro, with issue.
 Constança of Portugal, Lady of Portalegre, married Nuño González de Lara, without issue.
 Beatriz of Portugal, Lady of Lemos, married, as his first wife, Pedro Fernández de Castro, without issue.

Ancestors

1265 births
1314 deaths
Anscarids
Castilian infantas
Portuguese infantas
Spanish princesses
People from Lisbon
14th-century Castilians
14th-century Portuguese people
14th-century Spanish women
14th-century Portuguese women
13th-century Castilians
13th-century Portuguese people
13th-century Spanish women
13th-century Portuguese women